This is a list of notable birdwatchers and of people who are notable in their own right but also happen to be birdwatchers.

First are listed birdwatchers with large life lists, which is based on the number of species of birds each of them has/had seen. Depending on the taxonomic viewpoint, there are 10,721 (Clements V2019) or 10,787 (IOC ver. 10.2) living bird species recognised.

Large life lists

As of 7 March 2023 according to the Surfbirds website, there are 22 birders who have added 9,000 or more species of birds to their life lists. An additional 37 birders have added at least 8,000 species of life birds. These 59 birders include:
Claes-Göran Cederlund: 9,761/ 9,798  (#1 on Surfbirds, #1 on igoterra). Deceased 2020)
Philip Rostron: 9,757  (#2 on Surfbirds—#1 of those still living) 
Peter Kaestner: 9,746  / 9,782 / 9,596 (#3 on Surfbirds / #2 on igoterra / #1 on eBird).  Discovered the Cundinamarca antpitta (Grallaria kaestneri), which was subsequently named after him. First birder to see a representative of each of the world's (currently 249 [2021 eBird/Clements list] or 253 [2022 IOC list]) bird families.
 Sue Williamson: 9,209  (#16 on Surfbirds—#1 female birder)
 Phoebe Snetsinger: 8,398 (deceased 1999). First person ever to see 8,000 species. At time of her death in Madagascar she was World #1.
Bernard Master: 8,346 The Chocó vireo (Vireo masteri) is named after him.

Other notable birdwatchers

Ramana Athreya: birdwatcher and astronomer
 Mindy Baha El Din: ornithologist and environmentalist
 Florence Merriam Bailey: ornithologist and author of several early field guides
 Jim Clements: author of The Clements Checklist of the Birds of the World; 7,200 (deceased in 2005)
 Dominic Couzens: ornithologist and author
 Lee G R Evans: British twitcher and ornithologist
 Kenn Kaufman: American field guide author and writer
 Richard Koeppel: subject of To See Every Bird on Earth; a life list of over 7,000
 Starr Saphir: led bird walks in New York City's Central Park for nearly four decades
 David Allen Sibley: American artist and field guide author

Birdwatchers famous for achievements in other fields

 Joseph H. Acklen, U.S. Representative from Louisiana
 Damon Albarn, English musician, singer-songwriter, multi-instrumentalist and record producer
 Simon Armitage, British poet, playwright and novelist
 Margaret Atwood, Canadian poet, novelist, literary critic, essayist, and environmental activist
 John James Audubon, ornithologist and painter
 Bill Bailey, English comedian, musician, actor, TV and radio presenter and author
 Sean Bean, English actor of stage and screen
 Stephen Breyer, United States Supreme Court Justice
 Alan Brooke, British Chief of the Imperial General Staff during the Second World War
 Laura Bush, former First Lady of the United States
 Jimmy Carter, President of the United States
 Fidel Castro, President of Cuba
 Adam Cayton-Holland, American stand-op comic
 Agatha Christie, Author and playwright
 Kenneth Clarke, British Conservative politician
 Jeremy Clarkson, English broadcaster, journalist and writer
 Jarvis Cocker, English musician and frontman for the band Pulp
 Wes Craven, American film director
 George Crook, 19th century U.S. Army General
 Peter Cushing, English actor, known for his many appearances in Hammer Films and Star Wars
 Fyfe Dangerfield, English musician and songwriter, best known as the founding member of the indie rock band Guillemots
 Jared Diamond, American geographer, evolutionary biologist, physiologist, lecturer, and nonfiction author
 Cameron Diaz, American actress and former model
 Robert Dougall, newsreader and announcer
 Alec Douglas-Home, British Conservative politician who served as Prime Minister from October 1963 to October 1964
 Bill Drummond, South African-born Scottish artist, musician, writer, and record producer
 Prince Philip, Duke of Edinburgh
 Richard Feynman, American theoretical physicist
 Ian Fleming, English author, journalist and naval intelligence officer
 Anna Ford, journalist and television presenter
 Jonathan Franzen, American novelist and essayist
 Guy Garvey, English singer and guitarist in the band Elbow, presenter for BBC 6 Music and A&R manager of Skinny Dog Records
 Murray Gell-Mann, Leading theoretical physicist, Nobel Laureate in Physics
 Graeme Gibson, Canadian novelist
 Jimi Goodwin, English bassist, vocalist and guitarist for Doves
 Trudie Goodwin, English actress
 Benjamin F. Goss, Legislator, officer in the American Civil War
 Crawford Greenewalt, president of DuPont
 Edward Grey, 1st Viscount Grey of Fallodon, British Liberal statesman 
 Jan Hamber, California condor conservationist and birdwatcher
 Daryl Hannah, American actress
 Ian Harding, American actor, Pretty Little Liars, author of Odd Birds
 Michael Heseltine, Welsh-British businessman, Conservative politician and patron of the Tory Reform Group
 Mick Jagger, English musician, singer, songwriter and actor, best known as lead vocalist and founding member of the Rolling Stones
 Norman Lamont, British politician and former Conservative MP for Kingston upon Thames
 Meriwether Lewis, Explorer
 Phil Liggett, Cycling commentator
 Joanna Lumley, English actress, voice-over artist, former-model and author
 Humphrey Lyttelton, English jazz musician and broadcaster
 Steve Martin, Writer, comedian, musician
 Per Martin-Löf, Swedish mathematical scientist
 Ernst Mayr, Evolutionary biologist, tropical explorer, ornithologist, historian of science
 Paul McCartney, English musician, best known as member of the Beatles.
 Griffin McElroy, American podcaster and comedian
 Rory McGrath, British comedian and writer
 Eric Morecambe, English comedian
 Elliot Morley, Former Labour Party politician
 Van Morrison, Northern Irish singer-songwriter and musician
 Sir Andrew Motion, English poet, novelist, and biographer, who was Poet Laureate of the United Kingdom from 1999 to 2009
 Victor Muller, Dutch entrepreneur, CEO Spyker Cars
 Sanjeeva Nayaka, Indian lichenologist
 Tig Notaro, American Stand-up comic and actor
 Patrick O'Brian, Author
 Bill Oddie, Actor, author, comedian, television presenter
 Henry Paulson, Secretary of the Treasury under U.S. President George W. Bush
 Neil Peart, Canadian musician, drummer/songwriter for Rush (band)
 George Plimpton, Author
 Vic Reeves,  English comedian
 Debby Reynolds, British veterinary surgeon
 David Ridgen, Canadian filmmaker
 Alexandre Rodrigues Ferreira, was a Brazilian-Portuguese naturalist
 Theodore Roosevelt, President of the United States
 Richard Rorty, American philosopher 
 Mark Salling, Actor and musician
 Alison Steadman, English actress
 John Stott, Author, theologian and evangelical leader
 Amy Tan, Author
 Lili Taylor, American actress, American Birding Association board member
 Laura Wade, British playwright
 James D. Watson, Nobel laureate, molecular biologist, and co-discoverer of the structure of DNA
 Samuel West, British actor and director
 E. B. White, Author
 Boonsong Lekagul, Thai physician, nonfiction author, and conservationist

See also
 List of ornithologists

References

 
Lists of people by activity
Lists of people by occupation